Osvaldo Couto Cardoso Pinto (born 5 March 1969 in Malanje, Portuguese Angola), commonly known as Vado, is a Portuguese former footballer who played as a central midfielder.

External links

1969 births
Living people
Portuguese footballers
Association football midfielders
Primeira Liga players
Liga Portugal 2 players
Segunda Divisão players
Portimonense S.C. players
C.S. Marítimo players
S.C. Braga players
C.D. Beja players
CD Operário players
Portugal under-21 international footballers
Portugal international footballers
Footballers from Malanje